Woody Allen: A Documentary is a 2011 documentary television miniseries directed by Robert B. Weide about the comedian, and filmmaker Woody Allen. The documentary series premiered as part of the American Masters series PBS. The film covers his career as a standup comedian, sitcom writer, film director, and film auteur. The series received two Primetime Emmy Award nominations for Outstanding Documentary Series and Directing for a Documentary Program for Robert B. Weide.

Summary
The series covers Allen's childhood living with a large Jewish family in the neighborhood of Brooklyn New York in the 1930s to starting his career in Greenwich Village as a standup comedian and working as a comedy writer alongside Mel Brooks, Carl Reiner, Neil Simon, and Larry Gelbart on Sid Caesar's Your Show of Shows. The series also discusses his early comedy films, his awards success with Annie Hall (1977), his prominence as a writer and directing as well as the highs and lows of his professional and personal career spanning seven decades ending around his latest film Midnight in Paris (2011).

Many artists, historians, and critics were interviewed which include:

Episodes

Production 
Susan Lacy, who created the PBS American Masters series has overseen programs of Buster Keaton and Jerome Robbins to John Lennon and Bob Dylan served as an executive producer on the project telling The Hollywood Reporter, "This is the Woody doc everybody has been waiting for, and I am delighted that this creative giant is finally assuming his rightful place in the American Masters library".

Reception 
The two part documentary series received positive reviews. On Rotten Tomatoes, the series holds an approval rating of 90% based on 21 reviews. The website's critical consensus states, "Driving aside the most polemical aspects of the director's biography, Woody Allen: A Documentary draws an interesting picture of the filmmaker's opus while allowing some glimpses of his intense personal life."

Tim Goodman of The Hollywood Reporter praised Weide and the series writing, "Writer and director Robert Weide got unfettered access to one of the country's great and most prolific directors whose private life and personal feelings about his work had never been adequately captured. Credit Weide, who spent a year and a half with Allen, including at home, traveling and on the set of a working film, for not botching such a grand opportunity."

Peter Bradshaw of The Guardian also wrote positively writing, "To see him scribbling scripts on his yellow legal pads or hammering them out on a typewriter that he has had since a teenager is almost awe-inspiring. There can't be a life story in postwar American cinema more inspiring than his: the comic genius who started out as a gag-writer for the newspapers, then a standup, and then a film-maker who insisted on auteur prerogative without ever needing to use the word, and who became an evangelist for the masters of European cinema." Bradshaw also criticized the series, however, for failing to discuss seriously the "elephant in the room", the scandal involving the marriage to Soon-Yi Previn. Bradshaw writes, "Soon-Yi is discussed very gingerly, cursorily; there's a montage of the tabloid front pages, and Allen blandly says that people are entitled to whatever opinion they like."

Awards and nominations

References

External links
 

PBS American Masters

2010s American television miniseries
English-language television shows
Woody Allen